Swamp Thing is a 1982 American superhero horror film written and directed by Wes Craven, based on the Vertigo/DC Comics character of the same name created by Len Wein and Bernie Wrightson. It tells the story of scientist Alec Holland (Ray Wise) who becomes transformed into the monster known as Swamp Thing (Dick Durock) through laboratory sabotage orchestrated by the evil Anton Arcane (Louis Jourdan). Later, he helps a woman named Alice Cable (Adrienne Barbeau) and battles the man responsible for it all, the ruthless Arcane. The film did well on home video and cable and was followed by a sequel, The Return of Swamp Thing, in 1989.

Plot 
After a scientist is mysteriously killed while assisting a top-secret bioengineering project, government worker Alice Cable arrives at the bogs to serve as his replacement. Alice immediately notices that one of the team's swamp sensors has malfunctioned, Harry Ritter reveals that her predecessor was attempting to repair it when he was killed. Charlie tells Ritter a rumor about an evil paramilitary leader named Anton Arcane, who intends to hijack their operation. Alice introduces herself to Dr. Linda Holland and her brother, lead scientist Dr. Alec Holland, who takes her on a tour and encourages her to admire the beauty of the swamps.

After noting the disappearance of one of their workers, the group hears a loud bang and returns to the laboratory, where Linda shows off her recent breakthrough: a glowing, plant-based concoction with explosive properties. Sometime later, Alec notices that droplets of Linda's formula spawned rapid plant growth on the surfaces they touched. Suddenly, a group of paramilitary agents attack her and raid Alec's laboratory. A man resembling Ritter steps forward, but pulls off his mask and reveals himself as Arcane. When Arcane shoots Linda for attempting to escape with the formula, Alec grabs the beaker, but trips, causing the spilled chemicals to set him on fire. He runs outside and dives into the swamp to extinguish the flames as a series of explosions burst from the water.

Overnight, Arcane's henchmen destroy the premises and remove all evidence of the team's work. At dawn, a henchman captures Alice and attempts to drown her in the swamp, but a green, humanlike creature rescues her. Meanwhile, in his mansion, Arcane and his secretary realize that Alec's most recent notebook is missing. Alice runs to a nearby gas station to telephone her employers for help; the operator connects to Ritter, who claims to have been called away from the site before the attack. After revealing she stole Alec's last notebook, Alice waits for Ritter's return alongside the young gas station attendant, Jude, but Arcane's men arrive and chase her through the forest. Suddenly, the green humanoid creature, referred to as the Swamp Thing, appears and again scares the pursuers away and Alice escapes.

Alice and Jude boat around the swamp until they reach the dock near the laboratory wreckage. Multiple boats of Arcane's men close in on Alice and Jude, luring the creature from its hiding place among the reeds. Despite their bullets and grenades, the Swamp Thing engineers an elaborate boat crash. Moments after instructing Jude to escape with Alec's notebook, Alice hears the boy cry out in distress, but she is kidnapped before she can reply. The Swamp Thing finds Jude's lifeless body and presses a hand against his head, creating a greenish glow which instantly revives him. Regaining consciousness, Jude realizes the creature is a friend of Alice's and gives it the notebook for safekeeping. On Arcane's boat, Alice throws her kidnapper, Ferret, overboard, then dives into the water and swims ashore. Once on land, Alice bumps into the Swamp Thing, which calls out her name. Ferret chops off the Swamp Thing's arm with a machete, but the creature easily snaps Ferret's neck, causing Alice to faint. She awakens in the monster's embrace. The Swamp Thing speaks to her, and she recognizes it as Alec. Arcane's men follow her, capture the Swamp Thing in a net, and retrieve the final notebook.

That evening, Arcane invites Alice to a formal dinner party celebrating his duplication of the Hollands’ formula. Moments after giving a toast to prospective immortality, Arcane reveals that he secretly slipped the first dose to Bruno, who begins to convulse. The hulking man's body shrinks to half its size as he grows pointed ears and a misshapen skull. Arcane locks him in a dungeon alongside the Swamp Thing, asking the latter creature why the experiment failed. The Swamp Thing reveals that the formula does not produce strength, but instead amplifies a person's natural qualities, explaining that Bruno's timidity caused his diminished stature.

After locking Alice in the dungeon with them, Arcane returns to his study and drinks a glass of the formula. A beam of sunlight emitted through the door re-grows the Swamp Thing's missing arm, allowing the creature to free itself, Alice, and Bruno. Upstairs, Arcane transforms into a hairy, boar like beast, and descends to the dungeons. There, he discovers that his captives have escaped through an underwater tunnel leading back to the swamp. Sometime later, Alice and the Swamp Thing emerge from the water, followed closely by Arcane, who stabs Alice with a sword. The Swamp Thing revives Alice then kills Arcane. The creature turns to leave, but Alice pleads for him to stay so that she can help him rebuild his work. He refuses, but promises to return to her soon. Moments later, Jude emerges from the trees and embraces her as they watch the Swamp Thing lumber away through the marsh.

Cast 
 Ray Wise as Alec Holland
 Adrienne Barbeau as Alice Cable (a female version of Matt Cable in place of the Swamp Thing's comic book love interest Abby Arcane, who appears in the sequel)
 Louis Jourdan as Anton Arcane
 Dick Durock as the Swamp Thing
 David Hess as Ferret
 Nicholas Worth as Bruno
 Don Knight as Harry Ritter
 Al Ruban as Charlie
 Nannette Brown as Dr. Linda Holland
 Reggie Batts as Jude
 Karen Price as Karen

Production

Filming
Filming occurred primarily on location in Cypress Gardens, Monks Corner, South Carolina. Wes Craven was very proud in delivering the film on time and on budget at $2.5 million.

Writing
In writing the film, Wes Craven referenced Werner Herzog's 1974 film The Enigma of Kaspar Hauser which was originally called Every Man for Himself and God Against All. Another mercenary says the line to the character named Bruno. In Enigma, the lead character was played by Bruno Schleinstein (credited as Bruno S.).

Release

Home media 
Swamp Thing was released on VHS, Laserdisc, DVD and Blu-ray.

In August 2000, Metro-Goldwyn-Mayer released the film on DVD in the United States. Though the DVD was labeled as being the PG-rated, domestic cut of the film, MGM had inadvertently used the 93-minute international cut of the film which contained more nudity and sexual content than the US theatrical cut. This DVD edition also erroneously lists the release date as 1981, instead of 1982. In May 2002, a Dallas woman rented the disc from a Blockbuster Video store for her children and reported this discrepancy. MGM recalled the disc and reissued it in August 2005, with the US theatrical cut as originally intended.

Swamp Thing was released in a Blu-ray/DVD combo pack by Shout! Factory on August 6, 2013. The set features the 91-minute cut of the film presented in high definition widescreen format, along with bonus content including interviews with Adrienne Barbeau, Len Wein, and Reggie Batts, as well as commentary tracks with Wes Craven and makeup artist Bill Munn.

In the UK the 93-minute cut was released on Blu-ray by 88films on March 25, 2019.

MVD Entertainment Group is planning an Ultra HD Blu-ray release of Swamp Thing for 2023.

Reception

Critical response
Swamp Thing received mixed to positive reviews from critics. The site's critical consensus reads: "Unabashedly campy -- often to its detriment -- Swamp Thing is not without its charms, among them Adrienne Barbeau as the damsel in distress". Roger Ebert gave the film three out of four stars.

Author John Kenneth Muir notes that Swamp Thing differs in many respects from Craven's usual work, in that Craven's intent was to show the major Hollywood studios that he could handle action, stunts and major stars. Craven substituted his usual focus on the problems of family and society for pure entertainment. Nevertheless, Muir points out, some of Craven's usual themes and images do appear in Swamp Thing. For example, as in The Last House on the Left (1972), and The Hills Have Eyes (1977), Craven shows a close connection between the landscape and his characters. The film was adapted in comic form as Swamp Thing Annual #1.

PopMatters journalist J.C. Maçek III wrote: "As much fun as this film can be (and it often is), it's equally often difficult to ignore that Swamp Thing ultimately is, at core, a rubber-suit monster movie".

DVD Talk rated the film as 3 stars of 5 stars as "Recommended".

Other media

Sequel
A sequel entitled The Return of Swamp Thing was released in 1989.

Television series
In July 1990, USA Network premiered the Swamp Thing television series. This saw Dick Durock reprising his role using a modified version of the Return of Swamp Thing costume. The series took a deliberate turn away from the campy themes of its 1989 film predecessor and leaned toward the darkness of Wes Craven's version. It lasted into 1993 with a total of 72 episodes.

Animated series
A short-lived animated series was also produced concurrently. It does not share continuity with either the films or live-action series.

Reboots
In 2009, Joel Silver announced plans to produce a reboot of the Swamp Thing film franchise from a story written by Akiva Goldsman. In April 2010, Vincenzo Natali was confirmed to direct, but in May he decided to delay the Swamp Thing reboot to pursue other projects.

In January 2023, a new reboot was announced as part of the DCU by James Gunn.

Other appearances
Adrienne Barbeau made a guest appearance in the episode "Long Walk Home" of DC Universe's 2019 Swamp Thing series.

References

External links 
 
 
 
 
 
 

1982 fantasy films
1980s monster movies
1980s science fiction comedy films
1980s superhero films
1982 films
1982 horror films
American action horror films
American monster movies
American science fiction comedy films
Embassy Pictures films
Films based on DC Comics
Films based on works by Len Wein
Films directed by Wes Craven
Films scored by Harry Manfredini
Films set in Louisiana
Films shot in South Carolina
Live-action films based on DC Comics
Mad scientist films
Superhero horror films
Swamp Thing in other media
1982 comedy films
1980s English-language films
1980s American films